Lawrenceville is an unincorporated community and census-designated place (CDP) located within Lawrence Township in Mercer County, New Jersey, United States. As of the 2010 United States Census, the CDP's population was 3,887. Lawrenceville is located roughly halfway between Princeton and Trenton.

Lawrenceville is also known as the "village of Lawrenceville". Its core is the Main Street Historic District, which was listed in the New Jersey and National Registers of Historic Places in 1972, one of the first registered historic districts in New Jersey.

History 
Lawrenceville was founded as Maidenhead in 1697, as part of Burlington County in the colony of West Jersey. In 1714, the village became a part of Hunterdon County. In 1798, the New Jersey Legislature legally incorporated the Township of Maidenhead.

The village was originally named for Maidenhead, a historic English town on the Thames River, about 30 miles west from London. The Colonial Supreme Court at Burlington officially confirmed the name on February 20, 1697. "Maidenhead" derives from the Anglo Saxon word "Maidenhythe," meaning "new wharf", though it acquired a secondary meaning as a term for virginity.

The Rev. Issac V. Brown, the first full-time pastor of the Presbyterian Church of Lawrenceville and the founder of the Academy of Maidenhead (now the Lawrenceville School), led a movement to petition the Legislature to change the town's name. The petition said "... it must be the wish of every good citizen... to be relieved of the necessity of using a term which may offend the delicacy of modesty, or disturb the feelings of seriousness, or excite the sneers of the willing".

The Legislature officially changed the name from Maidenhead to Lawrence on January 24, 1816, at a meeting in John Moore's Tavern. The township took its name from Captain James Lawrence, a naval hero of the War of 1812. The village was renamed Lawrenceville at the same time. In 1838, Mercer County was formed from parts of three counties, and Lawrence Township was included in the new County. The Township's boundaries and geographic relationships have remained the same since that time.

During the American Revolutionary War, George Washington's troops marched through Maidenhead after the Battle of Trenton (December 26, 1776) and the Battle of the Assunpink Creek (January 2, 1777), chasing British troops. They met at the Battle of Princeton on January 3, 1777, just over the township line, where the Princeton Battlefield State Park now stands.

Cornwallis stayed overnight in Maidenhead on December 8, 1776, en route to Trenton. Cornwallis recorded the moment in his diary, a portion of which was found years later in John Moore's Tavern, which is now a residential house at 2695 Main Street. His opinion of the village was that "one night in Maidenhead was more than enough".

When the Presbyterian Church of Lawrenceville was built in 1698, it was called the Meetinghouse of Maidenhead. It is still serving the community at 2688 Main Street.

Geography
According to the United States Census Bureau, the CDP had a total area of 1.043 square miles (2.701 km2), including 1.042 square miles (2.698 km2) of land and 0.001 square miles (0.002 km2) of water (0.09%).

U.S. Route 206 (US 206) changes its name from "Lawrenceville-Princeton Road" to "Main Street", and then to "Lawrenceville-Trenton Road" in the center of Lawrenceville. The local historic district fronts along Main Street and US 206 stretch for more than two miles between Franklin Corner Road and an area slightly north of Fackler Road. Homes situated more than 250 feet from the road are excluded, however. One exception is the section of The Lawrenceville School known as the Circle and several other buildings in its vicinity, the oldest buildings on the campus. This area itself has been designated a National Historic Landmark.

Lawrenceville generally comprises the area contained within Lawrenceville-Pennington Road to the south, Fackler Road to the north, Keefe Road to the west, and US 206, part of which turns into Main Street in Lawrenceville, to the east. The Lawrenceville School, across Route 206, is usually considered part of the village as well. Before tract development, beginning in the early 1970s, Lawrenceville was broadly defined as stretching two to three blocks back from Route 206. The boundary became less clear as residential developments replaced farmland behind the historic village.

Lawrence Township is occasionally and mistakenly referred to as Lawrenceville. The confusion is partly caused because the local post office is located in the Lawrenceville CDP and the Postal Service once instructed Lawrence Township residents to use Lawrenceville, Princeton or Trenton as their mailing address. In 1973, voters approved a nonbinding referendum to petition the U.S. Postal Service to adopt a single municipal post office address known as Lawrenceville for the entire township; The effort failed. A township resident appeared before Township Council in July, 2007, to request to designate the 08648 ZIP code for Lawrence Township. Council approved a resolution in support of the request that was then forwarded to the U.S. Postal Service. Township officials had fought, off and on, for the change since 1969, when then-U.S. Rep. Frank Thompson tried unsuccessfully to convince U.S. Postal Service authorities to grant a Lawrence name tag for the entire township, according to a letter on file at the Municipal Clerk's Office.  The United States Postal Service notified the township authorities in October 2007 that the preferred designation for the 08648 would be changed to "Lawrence Township".

Lawrenceville is equidistant between Trenton and Princeton, almost being equidistant from New York and Philadelphia, with it being roughly fifteen miles closer to Philadelphia. Major transportation corridors have passed through Lawrenceville since the town's inception, including The King's Highway, which in the 18th century approximated today's US 206.

Demographics

Census 2010

Census 2000
As of the 2000 United States Census there were 4,081 people, 1,747 households, and 1,070 families residing in the CDP. The population density was 1,515.1/km2 (3,926.5/mi2). There were 1,776 housing units at an average density of 659.3/km2 (1,708.7/mi2). The racial makeup of the CDP was 88.12% White, 3.58% African American, 0.07% Native American, 6.30% Asian, 0.54% from other races, and 1.40% from two or more races. Hispanic or Latino of any race were 3.46% of the population.

Of the 1,747 households, 32.2% had children under the age of 18 living with them; 48.7% were married couples living together; 10.5% had a female householder with no husband present; and 38.7% were non-families. 32.3% of all households were made up of individuals, and 8.6% had someone living alone who was 65 years of age or older. The average household size was 2.33 and the average family size was 2.99.

In the CDP the population was spread out, with 24.2% under the age of 18; 5.8% from 18 to 24; 32.2% from 25 to 44; 27.7% from 45 to 64; and 10.1% who were 65 years of age or older. The median age was 39 years. For every 100 females, there were 83.7 males. For every 100 females age 18 and over, there were 77.7 males.

The median income for a household in the CDP as of the year 2000 was $74,107. The median income for a family was $98,972. Males had a median income of $65,189 versus $37,972 for females. The per capita income for the CDP was $37,919. About 0.6% of families and 1.7% of the population were below the poverty line, including none of those under age 18 and 4.1% of those age 65 or over.

Education

The Lawrenceville Elementary School, one of Lawrence Township Public Schools' four elementary schools, is located in Lawrenceville.

Lawrenceville is home to the Lawrenceville School, a private boarding and day high school founded in 1810. It is one of the oldest and most prestigious prep schools in the United States.

Commerce
Historically, the Lawrenceville School was the dominant economic force in the village. Since World War II, Lawrenceville has become a commuter town, serving educational and corporate employment centers in Lawrence Township, in Princeton and Trenton, in the surrounding cluster of corporate and research campuses, and to a lesser extent in New York City. There are no large businesses in Lawrenceville itself, but Lawrence Township is home to several large corporate facilities outside of the village, including the world headquarters of Educational Testing Service, offices for the Lenox division of Department 56, the main research facility for Bristol Myers Squibb, and the offices of the Peterson's division of Nelnet.

The village businesses share an organization, Lawrenceville Main Street, which organizes events, such as the Music in the Park series, the annual Jubilee, and Taste of Lawrenceville, and promotes the business district to visitors. The Lawrenceville Farmers Market is held every Sunday, from about June to November.

The Lawrenceville Fire Co., Lawrenceville Water Co. (now part of Aqua America), Lawrenceville Fuel, and a U.S. Post Office are also located in Lawrenceville.

Lawrenceville was formerly home to a family grocery, hardware store, pharmacy, and, most famously, the Jigger Shop, which served generations of Lawrenceville School students as a school store and soda fountain. A fire destroyed the shop on August 10, 1990. Caused by faulty electrical cords that ran to a store refrigerator, the fire burned through the store's ceiling into the second-floor apartment, which was unoccupied .  A new Jigger Shop then opened at The Lawrenceville School and was located on the first floor of the Noyes History Building, until its relocation to the Irwin Dining Center in 2011.

The offices of the Princeton Area Community Foundation are in Lawrenceville.

Notable people

People who were born in, residents of, or otherwise closely associated with Lawrenceville include:
 Kevin Bannon (born 1957), former men's college basketball head coach who was the Rutgers Scarlet Knights men's basketball team's head coach from 1997 through 2001.
 Ifa Bayeza (born Wanda Williams), playwright, producer and conceptual theater artist.
 Dierks Bentley (born 1975), country music musician.
 Brett Brackett (born 1987), former tight end for the Seattle Seahawks.
 David Brearley (1745–1790), signer of the United States Constitution and Chief Justice of the New Jersey Supreme Court from 1779-1789.
 George H. Brown (1810–1865), represented  in the United States House of Representatives from 1853 to 1855.
 Scott Brunner (born 1957), former NFL quarterback.
 Mark Carlson (born 1969), President, Head Coach and General Manager of the Cedar Rapids RoughRiders.
 Richard J. Coffee (born 1924), founder of Mercer County Park and a former state senator.
 Oliver Crane (born 1998), rower, who set the record as the youngest person to row solo across the Atlantic Ocean, when he completed the  journey in 2018.
 Carlos Dengler (born 1974), former Interpol bassist.
 Tony DeNicola (1927-2006), jazz drummer.
 N. Howell Furman (1892-1965), professor of analytical chemistry who helped develop the electrochemical uranium separation process as part of the Manhattan Project.
 Eb Gaines (1927-2012), U.S. Consul General to Bermuda from 1989 until 1992.
 Frederick Kroesen (1923–2020), United States Army four-star general
 Dan Lavery (born 1969), musician who has performed as part of The Fray and Tonic.
 James T.C. Liu (1919-1993), Chinese historian and a leading scholar on Song dynasty history who was a professor at Princeton University for more than two decades.
 Ed Moran (born 1981), long-distance runner.
 John Nalbone (born 1986), American football tight end.
 Jake Nerwinski (born 1994), Major League Soccer player for the Vancouver Whitecaps.
 Norman Schwarzkopf (1934-2012), United States Army general who was commander of coalition forces during the Gulf War.
 Jon Solomon (born 1973), DJ on WPRB.
 Myles Stephens (born 1997), basketball player for Kangoeroes Mechelen.
 Jon Stewart (born 1962), comedian and host of The Daily Show on Comedy Central.

References

External links

 Lawrenceville Main Street business association
 Lawrence Township
 Lawrence Historical Society

Lawrence Township, Mercer County, New Jersey
1697 establishments in New Jersey
Census-designated places in Mercer County, New Jersey
Populated places established in 1697